Alexandra Headland is a coastal suburb of Maroochydore in the Sunshine Coast Region, Queensland, Australia.

Geography
Alexandra Headland is located between Maroochydore CBD and Mooloolaba.

The suburb consists of several restaurants, a bowling alley, resorts and the shortest beach in the Maroochy district. The Alexandra Headland Surf Life Saving Club has a building next to the beach.

History
The rocky headland between the estuaries of the Maroochy and Mooloolah Rivers was once known as Potts Point, named after overseer John Potts employed by William Pettigrew. Potts lived on the land from 1880 to 1890, when it was used to transport timber between Cotton Tree and Mooloolah River by bullock. It was renamed Alexandra Headland in honour of Queen Alexandra, wife of King Edward VII, in 1901.

The area was formerly part of William Pettigrew's  property. The land was purchased in 1864 at the first land sale in the Maroochy District. Over the next 30 years it was used as Pettigrew's base for his timber business. The area was fenced as a paddock for the bullocks used to haul logs from Cotton tree across Potts Point to the timber depot at Mooloolaba (née Mooloolah Heads). Pettigrew built his house "Coolaluthin" and his overseers house "Wongotha" on the Headland.

Thomas O'Connor purchased all of Pettigrew's land at both Maroochydore and Mooloolaba in 1903. The land was subdivided and sold as allotments along the ocean front and Buderim Road in August 1915. It was during this time that the name Alexandra Headland was popularised.

Seaside cottages were built on the Headland during the 1920s. These were mostly built by the local residents from Woombye and Palmwoods.

In 1916 O'Connor proposed to develop the Alexandra Residential Hotel on 36 acres behind the main surfing beach on the corner of Alexandra Parade, Main Buderim Mountain Road (now Buderim Avenue) and Edward Street. The architect was Thomas Ramsay Hall. It was constructed between 1923 and 1928. This was the first fully integrated resort complex on the Maroochy coast. The endeavour proved unsuccessful and was sold to the Presbyterian Church.

With the ensuing upgrading of transport services and roads as well as further land sales saw the continued progress of Alexandra Headland as a holidays resort. The Headland now boasted a holiday resort with all facilities, including a patrolled surf beach on its northern edge.

The median age of the Alexandra Headland population was 45 years, 7 years above the national median of 38. 68.6% of people were born in Australia. The next most common countries of birth were New Zealand 4.9% and England 4.8%. 82.5% of people only spoke English at home. The most common responses for religion were No Religion 32.8%, Catholic 19.4% and Anglican 15.0%.

Amenities 
There are a number of parks in suburb, including:

 Alex Bluff Foreshore Park
 Alex Forest Conservation Area
 Buhk Family Park
 Cooloolathin Park
 Cotton Tree – Alex Foreshore Bushland Conservation Reserve
 Marina Walk
 Nelson Park
 Seaforth Park
 Wilkes Family Park

References

External links

 

Suburbs of the Sunshine Coast Region
Maroochydore
Coastline of Queensland